William Ripley Brown (July 16, 1840 – March 3, 1916) was a U.S. Representative from Kansas.

Born in Buffalo, New York, Brown studied at Phillips Exeter Academy, Exeter, New Hampshire. He went on to attend and graduate from Union College, Schenectady, New York, in 1862. He went immediately to Kansas and settled in Emporia. He studied law. He was admitted to the bar in 1864 and commenced practice in Emporia, Kansas. He served as judge of the ninth judicial district of Kansas 1867-1877.

Brown was elected as a Republican to the Forty-fourth Congress (March 4, 1875 – March 3, 1877). He was an unsuccessful candidate for renomination in 1876. He resumed the practice of law in Hutchinson, Kansas. Register of the United States land office in Larned, Kansas from 1883 to 1885. He moved to El Reno, Oklahoma, in 1892. Probate judge of Canadian County 1894-1898. He died in Kansas City, Missouri on March 3, 1916. He was interred in Lawrence Cemetery, Lawrence, Kansas.

References

1840 births
1916 deaths
Union College (New York) alumni
Kansas state court judges
Oklahoma state court judges
Phillips Exeter Academy alumni
Politicians from Hutchinson, Kansas
Republican Party members of the United States House of Representatives from Kansas
19th-century American politicians
People from Larned, Kansas
19th-century American judges